Desirée Dawson is a Canadian singer, songwriter and baritone ukulele player, from White Rock, British Columbia. She is best known as the winner of CBC Music's Searchlight talent contest in 2016.

Following her Searchlight win Dawson performed at the CBC Music Festival, and released her debut solo album Wild Heart in 2017.

Dawson has also appeared as a guest vocalist on the Pegboard Nerds' Nerds by Nature EP and their single "Disconnected VIP", and on Kicks N Licks' single "Sunny Day".

In 2020, Dawson appeared on Paul Chin's EP Full Spectrum, performing the lead single "Take It or Leave It", written at a songwriting camp held by Babyface.

Her 2021 EP, Meet You at the Light, was a Juno Award nominee for Adult Contemporary Album of the Year at the Juno Awards of 2022.

References

External links

Musicians from British Columbia
People from White Rock, British Columbia
Canadian ukulele players
Living people
Canadian women singer-songwriters
21st-century Black Canadian women singers
Year of birth missing (living people)